Ajab is a surname. Notable people with the surname include:

Ahmad Ajab (born 1994), Kuwaiti footballer
Khalid Ajab (born 1986), Kuwaiti footballer

See also
Ajab Shir, city in East Azerbaijan Province, Iran
Yusuf al-Ajab (1895–?), Sudanese politician